Glen Bryan (born February 13, 1989) is a  professional lacrosse player for the Toronto Rock of the National Lacrosse League and the Kitchener-Waterloo Kodiaks of Major Series Lacrosse. Hailing from Orangeville, Ontario, Bryan began his amateur career with the Orangeville Jr B Northmen, and worked his way up to the Jr A Northmen, with whom he won back-to-back Minto Cups in 2008 and 2009. He made his MSL debut in 2010 with the Brooklin Redmen, was drafted 5th overall by the Redmen in the 2011 MSL draft, and joined the Kodiaks in 2012. Bryan played collegiality at Wilfrid Laurier University, where he studied accounting.

Bryan was drafted in the second round of the 2010 NLL Entry Draft by the Toronto Rock, and played two years with the Rock. In 2012, he, along Jamie Rooney, was dealt to the Buffalo Bandits for a pair of draft picks. He played the next two years with the Bandits before being released prior to the 2015 season. He then re-signed with the Rock.

Statistics

NLL
Reference:

References

External links
NLL stats at pointstreak.com
MSL stats at pointstreak.com
OLA Jr A stats at pointstreak.com

1989 births
Living people
Lacrosse people from Ontario
Buffalo Bandits players
People from Orangeville, Ontario
Toronto Rock players
Wilfrid Laurier Golden Hawks players